Groupe SEB (Société d'Emboutissage de Bourgogne) is a large French consortium that produces small appliances, and it is the world's largest manufacturer of cookware. Notable brand names associated with Groupe SEB include All-Clad, IMUSA , Krups, Moulinex, Rowenta, Tefal (including OBH Nordica) and WMF Group. According to the Groupe SEB website, they have faced considerable competition from low-price Chinese competitors, but have managed to maintain a constant sales level. A large proportion of their product lines are now manufactured in China. Its headquarters are in Ecully, a Lyon suburb.

History 

The precursor to the Groupe SEB consortium was originally formed by Antoine Lescure in 1857. In 1977, they released the dedicated first-generation home video game console Telescore 750. Later, they released two revisions, the Telescore 751 and the Telescore 752.

Recent performance 
For the first half of 2008, Groupe SEB reported an increase in profit from 52 million euros in 2007 to 94 million euros. Groupe SEB now has a 61% interest in the Chinese cookware company Supor. For the second half of the year, Groupe SEB did not predict major changes in outlook.

In 2004, Groupe SEB acquired the high-end American cookware company All-Clad.  Weakness in the European markets is expected to be balanced out by further growth in North America and Asia.

In 2019 Groupe SEB strengthened the security of its press releases by adopting the Certidox solution. It ensures readers of the authenticity of its press releases by proving they have indeed been published by the company and their content is compliant with what the company has written.

References

External links 
 Group SEB website
 English-language pages on website

Companies based in Lyon
Home appliance manufacturers
1857 establishments in France
Lescure family
Home appliance manufacturers of France
Multinational companies headquartered in France
Companies listed on Euronext Paris